Thrikaripur a small town located in south part of Kasaragod District in the state of Kerala, India. Its southernmost end Olavara touches Payyannur, Kannur District.

Demographics 
The 2001 Census of India determined that the population of Trikaripur had a population of 32,626.

Geography 
Thrikaripur lies along the coast of Arabian Sea, at  This Panchayat serves as the separating border for Kasaragod District and Kannur District.

Educational Institutions

Colleges
 Rajiv Gandhi Institute of Pharmacy
 Trikaripur Arts & Science College (TASC)
SMMKT School of Information Technology & Commerce

Notable people 

 Arya (Jamshad Cethirakath)
 Asif Kottayil
 Muhammed Rafi
 Muttah Suresh
 Sathya (Shahir Cethirakath)

See also
Payyannur 8 km from Trikkaripur
Peringome 21 km from Payyanur
Ezhimala 12 km from Payyanur 
Kunhimangalam 5 km from Payyanur 
Kavvayi Island 3 km from Payyanur
Koyonkara
Ramanthali 7 km from Payyanur
Karivellur 10 km from Payyanur
Pilathara 7 km from Payyanur

References

External links

 Trikarpur.com - The first website for this village launched in 2000
 

Cheruvathur area